In continuum mechanics, hydrostatic stress, also known as volumetric stress, is a component of stress which contains uniaxial stresses, but not shear stresses. A specialized case of hydrostatic stress, contains isotropic compressive stress, which changes only in volume, but not in shape. Pure hydrostatic stress can be experienced by a point in a fluid such as water. It is often used interchangeably with "pressure" and is also known as confining stress, particularly in the field of geomechanics.

Hydrostatic stress is equivalent to the average of the uniaxial stresses along three orthogonal axes and can be calculated from the first invariant of the stress tensor:

Its magnitude in a fluid, can be given by:

For example, the magnitude of the hydrostatic stress felt at a point under ten meters of fresh water would be

where the index  indicates "water".

Because the hydrostatic stress is isotropic, it acts equally in all directions. In tensor form, the hydrostatic stress is equal to

where  is the 3-by-3 identity matrix.

Hydrostatic compressive stress is used for the determination of the bulk modulus for materials.

References

Continuum mechanics
Orientation (geometry)